was a junior college in Himeji, Hyōgo, Japan.

The institute was founded in 1957. The predecessor of the school was founded in 1951. It closed in 2008.

Educational institutions established in 1957
Japanese junior colleges
Private universities and colleges in Japan
Universities and colleges in Hyōgo Prefecture
1957 establishments in Japan